Crystal Lake also known as Sixtown Pond is a lake located by Butterville, New York. Fish species present in the lake are largemouth bass, walleye, northern pike, and yellow perch. There is a state owned carry down on Route 178, four miles east of Henderson. There is a 10 horsepower motor limit on Crystal Lake.

References

Lakes of New York (state)
Lakes of Jefferson County, New York